Senator Rea may refer to:
John Rea (politician) (1755–1829), Pennsylvania State Senate
J. Morris Rea (1846–1895), Iowa State Senate
James F. Rea (born 1937), Illinois State Senate